RAIC may refer to:

 Royal Architectural Institute of Canada, a Canadian association representing architects
 Redundant Array of Inexpensive Computers, a computer Server farm
 Restricted Area Identity Credential - see Airport security
 Russian-American Industrial Corporation, an international textile manufacturing project in Soviet Russia, 1922-1925